Jacques-Henri Schloesing (1919–1944) was a French aviator.

1919 births
1944 deaths
Companions of the Liberation
Free French Air Forces officers
French Protestants
Officiers of the Légion d'honneur
French military personnel killed in World War II